Vengeance is Mine (Ver Ni Vasulat) also called Vair Ka Badla is a 1935 social Hindi film directed by Sarvottam Badami based on K. M. Munshi's story. After directing three regional language films for Sagar Movietone, Badami was now directing films exclusively in Hindi. After the first Hindi film he directed Chandrahasa (1933), he shifted his focus to socially relevant topics and made two films based on Munshi's stories, Vengeance is Mine (1935) and Dr. Madhurika (1935). Vengeance is Mine was made on a story Munshi had written in Gujarati language as "Ver Ni Vasulat" in 1913 under the nom de plume "Ghanshyam". The cast included Kumar, Sabita Devi, Yakub, Sitara Devi, Padma Devi and Mehboob Khan.

Cast
 Kumar
 Sitara Devi
 Mehboob Khan
 Sabita Devi
 Yakub
 Padma Shaligram
 Ansari

Song List

References

External links

1935 films
1930s Hindi-language films
Indian black-and-white films
Films directed by Sarvottam Badami